Timure is a small town and headquarter of ward no. 2 of Gosaikund rural municipality. It is about 19 km north from Syaphru (headquarter of Gosaikunda rural municipality).

Previously Timure was a village development committee in Rasuwa District in the Bagmati Zone of northern Nepal. At the time of the 1991 Nepal census it had a population of 562 people living in 141 individual households. Reconstructions of local level units in Nepal on 10 March 2017 made it a part of new Gosaikunda rural municipality.

In December 2014, a port of entry between China and Nepal was opened near Rasuwa Fort a few kilometers north of the village.

See also
 Rasuwa Fort

References

External links
UN map of the municipalities of Rasuwa District

Populated places in Rasuwa District